Andreas Stamatiadis (born 16 August 1935) is a Greek former professional footballer who played as a forward for AEK Athens and a former manager. He is the longest serving captain of the club from 1960 to 1969.

Early life
Stamatiadis was born on 16 August 1935 in the refugee slum of Petralona. Child of a poor family, with an Asia Minor refugee father, he met and experienced the German Occupation and its aftermath at a tender age. Like many children of his generation, he too found a way out of the problems of everyday life by playing football in the abundant playgrounds of the neighborhood.

Club career
Stamatiadis started playing football at AE Melandias and in 1950, at the age of 15, he signed a sport's card for Sparta Petralona. The typical failure to sign the card by the Secretary of the team, essentially canceled his card and then his father, Dimitris and the coach of Sparta Petralona, Sertsikas took him for a test to the infrastructure departments of AEK Athens in Nea Filadelfeia. Stamatiadis, encouraged by his father, was already a fan of the yellow-blacks, joined the team's academies. The experienced eye of the then coach of the men's team, Jack Beby, immediately recognized the talent, ability and scoring fluency of the diminutive striker and with appropriate advice and guidance helped his development and establishment as a left winger where he flourished during the rich of his career acquiring the nickname "the Arrow". Beby's successor, Mario Magnozzi, gave him the opportunity to play for the first time in 1952 in a derby against Olympiacos. Thus, Stamatiadis managed to compete in two matches as a teammate of his childhood idol, Kleanthis Maropoulos, before the "Blonde Eagle", as was the nickname of the latter, retired as a footballer. Since then, an unrepeatable career began for Stamatiadis in AEK.

For the following 15 years, he became one of the pillars of the yellow-blacks. In fact, taking over the captaincy of the team from Giannis Kanakis and until the moment came to pass it to Mimis Papaioannou, he became the longest serving captain of AEK, proof of his leadership skills, the absolute respect he enjoyed from his teammates from time to time, as well as the trust shown in his person by the respective administrations and coaches for his composure, equanimity and rationality. As captain of the team, he lifted 2 championships, as well as the Greek Cup in 1966, while the Cup in 1956 was also to his achievements. He was a regular of the Athens Mixed Team selections during the 1950's.  On 3 December 1967 in the 1–4 away victory over Olympiacos, his ultimately fruitless attempt to "admonish" in the middle of the match the then young and hyperbole Spyros Pomonis, in order to simplify his way of playing for AEK to reach an even wider dominance, instead of his insistence on ridiculing the personal opponent, Orestis Pavlidis. Pomonis finally insisted on humiliating his opponent at all costs, AEK missed the opportunity for a mammoth score against the red and whites and Pavlidis took the decision that the role of referee suited him better, by retiring as a footballer. He was one of the main players of the team that won second place in the Balkans Cup in 1967, losing only in the final by Fenerbahçe. In his last season with the club, they reached the quarter-finals of the European Cup. In 1969, in the context of the general reorganization of the team's roster of the then coach Branko Stanković, he retired at the age of 34, never intending to play in any other jersey than the yellow-black. On 18 May 1969, he played for the last time in the 2–1 victory over Veria, even missing a penalty that was awarded to him by his teammates, obviously charged by the emotions of the moment.

International career
Stamatiadis had a total of 8 appearances with Greece. He made his debut at the age of 17, on 8 March 1954 in a 2–0 away victory over Israel in the 1954 FIFA World Cup qualifiers. His last appearance was on 27 November 1963 against Cyprus in an away friendly match.

Managerial career
Stamatiadis' former coach at AEK, Jenő Csaknády, with whom he shared mutual respect and family friendship, had recognized his abilities and high level of perception and encouraged him to get involved in coaching by helping him attend coaching schools and obtain a coaching diploma. The first team undertaken by Stamatiadis was Rodos, in 1969. He left the club after the end of the season and in the summer of 1974 he was hired as an assistant coach at AEK, where he worked next to František Fadrhonc, Zlatko Čajkovski and Ferenc Puskás, while he stepped in as the club's coach twice. Initially he took up the wheel of the team in 1977 for two games and afterwards before the end of the 1978–79 season, for 11 games, when he replaced Puskás in the technical leadership of the club, with the task of keeping the team at the top of the standings, something that he eventually achieved, while at the same time he reached the cup final.

In the summer of 1979, after his tenure at AEK was over, Stamatiadis took over as coach of Atromitos, where he secured the league title in second division, while in 1980 he sat for the first time on the bench of Egaleo in the second division, keeping them in the category. The following season, he claimed the promotion to the first division, which he did not secure in the end, as he was defeated by Rodos of Michalis Bellis in a draw, at the stadium of Heraklion, with 1–0 loss in at the extra time. In 1981 Stamatiadis was the coach of Diagoras, but in the summer of 1982 he returned to Egaleo. The team from the western suburbs won the last championship of the South and were promoted to the first division. Stamatiadis also coached Rodos, Trikala, Lamia, Anagennisi Karditsa, Chalkida and Acharnaikos.

In 1986, he also coached Greece U21 for six years, where in 1988 he led them to the final of the European U21 Championship, against France. From 1992 on, he worked time to time the infrastructure departments of AEK, while for several years he was the director of these departments, a position from which he left in 2013, when he was replaced by Akis Zikos.

After football
Stamatiadis continuously participates in the events of the AEK Veterans Association, of which he was also President, while bequeathing his adoration for the team to his two sons, Dimitris and Kostas, who are actively involved with AEK Amateur sections offering from administrative positions their services to the "double-headed eagle.

Style of play
Fast and with excellent technical training, competing close to the touchline, Stamatiadis had the ability to converge and sometimes threaten the opposition goal with thunderous shots. He was also the assist man of AEK Athens, as many goals that were scored by team stars such as Mimis Papaioannou, Kostas Nestoridis, Miltos Papapostolou and Giannis Marditsis, came from his feet. A rare leadership figure and an example of calmness and logic in adverse circumstances, he inspired confidence in his teammates and at the same time enjoyed the universal respect of his opponents. With a "sharp" eye, he immediately recognized the mistakes of the game and guided his teammates like a coach on the field.

Honours

As a player

AEK Athens
Alpha Ethniki: 1962–63, 1967–68
Greek Cup: 1955–56, 1963–64, 1965–66

Individual
Greek Cup top scorer: 1956–57

As a manager

AEK Athens
Alpha Ethniki: 1978–79

Atromitos
Beta Ethniki: 1979–80

Egaleo
Beta Ethniki: 1982–83

See also
List of one-club men in association football

References

1935 births
Living people
Greece international footballers
Super League Greece players
AEK Athens F.C. players
AEK Athens F.C. managers
Atromitos F.C. managers
Egaleo F.C. managers
AEK F.C. non-playing staff
Association football forwards
Greek football managers
Footballers from Athens
Greek footballers